Centreville Township is located in St. Clair County, Illinois. As of the 2010 census, its population was 25,386 and it contained 10,535 housing units. Centreville Township was formed from Centreville Station when it was subdivided on March 5, 1910.

Geography

Demographics

References

External links
City-data.com
St. Clair County Official Site
Illinois State Archives

Townships in St. Clair County, Illinois
Townships in Illinois